CHBY-FM is a Canadian radio station which broadcasts a classic hits format on the frequency of 106.5 MHz in Barry's Bay, Ontario. This is Barry's Bay's first commercial FM radio station.

Owned by the Haliburton Broadcasting Group, the station received CRTC approval on January 12, 2011.

The stations' new call sign will be CHBY-FM with the "Moose FM" branding and a launch date for the new radio station has yet to be announced.

On April 23, 2012 Vista Broadcast Group, which owns a number of radio stations in western Canada, announced a deal to acquire Haliburton Broadcasting, in cooperation with Westerkirk Capital. The transaction was approved by the CRTC on October 19, 2012.

In 2013, Vista had until January 12, 2014 to get CHBY on the air.  The station was granted a second extension date of October 19, 2015 to get the station on the air.

CHBY officially signed on the air at 12:00 PM on October 16, 2015 branded as 106.5 Moose FM. The station has a classic hits format and broadcasts from the CBC tower just outside Barry's Bay with an ERP of 12,000 watts.

References

External links
106.5 Moose FM

HBY
HBY
HBY
HBY
Radio stations established in 2011
2011 establishments in Ontario